Edmund or Edmond Hall may refer to:

People
 Edmund Hall (Australian politician) (1878–1965), Australian politician in Western Australian
 Edmund Hall (MP) (died 1592), English politician
 Edmund Hall (priest) (1620–1687), English royalist-presbyterian priest
 Edmond Hall (1901–1967), American jazz clarinetist

Buildings
 St Edmund Hall, Oxford, part of Oxford University in England

Architectural disambiguation pages